The 1999 Regal Welsh Open was a professional ranking snooker tournament that took place between 25 and 31 January 1999 at the Cardiff International Arena in Cardiff, Wales.

Paul Hunter was the defending champion, but he lost his last 32 match against Fergal O'Brien.

Mark Williams defeated Stephen Hendry 9–8 in the final to win his fifth ranking title.

Tournament summary

Defending champion Paul Hunter was the number 1 seed with World Champion John Higgins seeded 2. The remaining places were allocated to players based on the world rankings. Ronnie O'Sullivan made a maximum break during the third frame of his quarter final victory over James Wattana.

Main draw

Final

Century breaks

References

Welsh Open (snooker)
1999 in snooker
1990s in Cardiff
1999 in Welsh sport